Mibambwe I Sekarongoro I Mutabazi was Mwami of the Kingdom of Rwanda during the fifteenth century.

References 

15th-century monarchs in Africa
Rwandan kings